Kazal-type serine protease inhibitor domain-containing protein 1 is an enzyme that in humans is encoded by the KAZALD1 gene.

References

Further reading